What a Wife Learned is a 1923 American drama film directed by John Griffith Wray and starring John Bowers, Milton Sills, Marguerite De La Motte, Evelyn McCoy, Harry Todd, and Aggie Herring. Written by Bradley King, the film was released on January 28, 1923, by Associated First National Pictures.

Plot
As described in a film magazine, Sheila Dorne (De La Motte) fears that marriage would interfere with the literary career that she plans for herself, but nonetheless yields to her love for Jim Russell (Bowers) and weds him. Jim is a cattle rancher and man of dominant personality. Sheila scores a success with her first novel and it is dramatized. This work compels her to visit New York City and, although Jim's love for her is undiminished, it becomes evident that he is not happy with the turn things have taken. When the play is ready for presentation, Sheila prepares to go to New York City. An argument with Jim results, and there is a misunderstanding and considerable ill-feeling between the two as Sheila leaves. Only Jim's crippled sister Esther (McCoy) realizes his heart ache as Jim turns his attention to the building of an immense dam and tries to forget. The dam is finished and its test comes with the flood waters. Sheila returns home, accompanied by Rudolph Martin (Sills), who has dramatized her play and incidentally fallen in love with her, having become convinced that she no longer cares for her husband. Sheila and Martin become trapped by the flood waters. Sheila reaches a place of safety, and Jim and Rudolph struggle in the waters. Jim emerges, but then returns to save the man he imagines his wife loves. The dramatist, however, realizes the truth when Sheila rushes to aid them. She is left alone with Jim, whose dam has successfully met the flood test and is happy in his wife's love.

Cast
John Bowers as Jim Russell
Milton Sills as Rudolph Martin
Marguerite De La Motte as Sheila Dorne
Evelyn McCoy as Esther Russell
Harry Todd as Tracy McGrath
Aggie Herring as Maggie McGrath
Francelia Billington as Lillian Martin
Bertram Johns as Percy
Ernest Butterworth Jr. as Terry
John Steppling as Maxfield

References

External links

1923 films
1920s English-language films
Silent American drama films
1923 drama films
First National Pictures films
Films directed by John Griffith Wray
American silent feature films
American black-and-white films
1920s American films